is a railway station in the city of Fuji, Shizuoka Prefecture, Japan, operated by the private railway operator Gakunan Railway.

Lines

Station layout
Kamiya Station has one side platform serving a single track bi-directional. The station is unattended. In 2002, it was rebuilt with a sloping platform to permit barrier free access.

Adjacent stations

Station history
Kamiya Station was opened on January 20, 1953.

Passenger statistics
In fiscal 2017, the station was used by an average of 121 passengers daily (boarding passengers only).

Surrounding area
 Sudo Junior High School
 Sudo Elementary School

See also
 List of Railway Stations in Japan

References

External links

  

Railway stations in Shizuoka Prefecture
Railway stations in Japan opened in 1953
Fuji, Shizuoka